This list shows all deputies to the National Assembly of France from the Savoie department.

List

References 

Lists of members of the National Assembly (France)
Savoie